Penderyn is a rural village in the Cynon Valley, Rhondda Cynon Taf, Wales, located near Hirwaun.

Location
The village lies on the A4059 road between Hirwaun and Brecon and is the last settlement on that road in the county of Rhondda Cynon Taf before the border with Powys to the north. The village sits just within the southern boundary of the Brecon Beacons National Park. The River Cynon passes through the area.

There are four disused churches and chapels in Penderyn: Jerusalem Chapel (Calvinistic Methodist, now a house), Siloam Chapel (Baptist, a grade II listed building), Soar Chapel (Independent, now an antiques shop) and St Cynog's Church (Church in Wales).

Penderyn is the home of Penderyn Whisky, whose distillery is located opposite the local school. The award-winning single malt whisky was launched in 2004 and was the first distilled in Wales for over 100 years.

Etymology 
Penderyn contains two Welsh words:

 Pen, meaning 'head (of)'
 and 'deryn', an abbreviation of 'aderyn', meaning 'bird'

History 
Penderyn began as an agricultural village, which supplied the ever growing needs of the nearby local market town of Aberdare.

Until the county's inclusion in Powys in 1974 the village was in the county of Brecknockshire.

Governance
Penderyn is in the community of Hirwaun and, at the lowest tier of local government, is represented by Hirwaun & Penderyn Community Council. Penderyn is one of two electoral wards in the community, electing 4 members to the community council.

For elections to Rhondda Cynon Taf County Borough Council, Penderyn is covered by the 'Hirwaun, Penderyn and Rhigos' electoral district.

Notable people 
Gwyn Morgan (born 1954), Welsh-language writer, lives in Penderyn
David Wynne (1900–1983), composer, born in Penderyn
  (David Davies, 1853–1937), author of 
 Lewis Lewis (Lewsyn yr Heliwr), transported for his part in the Merthyr Rising of 1831

Dic Penderyn (Richard Lewis, 1807/8–1831), the central figure of the Merthyr Rising of 1831, was not from village but was from Aberavon.

See also
Moel Penderyn – a hill above the village

References

External links 
www.geograph.co.uk : photos of Penderyn and surrounding area

Villages in Rhondda Cynon Taf
Brecon Beacons
Fforest Fawr
Wards of Rhondda Cynon Taf